1,3,5-Trichlorobenzene is an organochlorine compound.  It is one of the three isomers of trichlorobenzene.  Being more symmetrical than the other isomers, it exists as colourless crystals whereas the other isomers are liquids at room temperature.

It is not formed upon chlorination of benzene.  Instead it is prepared by the Sandmeyer reaction from 3,5-dichloroaniline.

References

Chlorobenzenes